
Gmina Mircze is a rural gmina (administrative district) in Hrubieszów County, Lublin Voivodeship, in eastern Poland, on the border with Ukraine.

Villages
Gmina Mircze contains the villages and settlements of Ameryka, Andrzejówka, Borsuk, Dąbrowa, Górka-Zabłocie, Kryłów, Kryłów-Kolonia, Łasków, Małków, Małków-Kolonia, Marysin, Miętkie, Miętkie-Kolonia, Mircze, Modryń, Modryń-Kolonia, Modryniec, Mołożów, Mołożów-Kolonia, Prehoryłe, Radostów, Rulikówka, Smoligów, Stara Wieś, Szychowice, Tuczapy, Wereszyn and Wiszniów.

Neighbouring gminas
Gmina Mircze is bordered by the gminas of Dołhobyczów, Hrubieszów, Łaszczów, Telatyn, Tyszowce and Werbkowice. It also borders Ukraine.

References

Polish official population figures 2006

Mircze
Hrubieszów County